South Dakota Highway 17 (SD 17) is a  state highway in southeastern South Dakota, United States. It runs along the eastern edge of Lennox. SD 17 formerly continued south to what is now SD 46 near Centerville, and north to SD 42 west of Sioux Falls.

Route description

SD  begins at the intersection with SD 44 in southeastern Lennox, in the west-central part of Lincoln County. It ends at the intersection with 278th Street at the northeastern corner of the Lennox corporate limits.

History

The original SD 17 was established in 1926, from west of Milbank to Peever. This became part of SD 15 by 1929 when it extended north.
The current SD 17 was established by 1929. It originally began at an intersection with what is now SD 46 near Centerville. This segment was decommissioned in the 1990s.

In 2018, the South Dakota State Legislature removed the portion of SD 17 that ran from its current northern terminus up to SD 42 from the state highway system and turned it over to local control.

Major intersections

See also

References

External links

 The Unofficial South Dakota Highways Page: Highways 1-30

0017
Transportation in Lincoln County, South Dakota
Transportation in Minnehaha County, South Dakota